Kunkush (Ancash Quechua for Puya raimondii, also spelled Cuncush) may refer to:

 Kunkush, a mountain in the Recuay Province, Ancash Region, Peru
 Kunkush (Bolognesi), a mountain in the Bolognesi Province, Ancash Region, Peru
 Kunkush (Huari), a mountain in the Huari Province, Ancash Region, Peru
 Kunkush (Lima), a mountain in the Lima Region, Peru